The Entertainer is the third  studio album by Nigerian Afrobeats recording artist  D'banj, released in 2008. Production on the album was handled by Don Jazzy. It features guest appearances from Wande Coal, Special Kid, and Kayswitch 'D Produkt’. It was supported by seven singles—"Fall in Love", "Gbono Feli Feli", "Suddenly", "Kimon", "Igwe", "Olorun Maje", and "Entertainer". The album was named in reference to D'banj's skill as an entertainer. The album was a commercial success due largely to radio airplay, distribution, and marketing strategies.

Background
Commenting on the album, D'banj said: "I tried not to remind my listeners of the high level of unemployment, poverty, disease, electricity outage including the pains and all the troubles in this world. The concept is to keep it live and happy. All the songs are my personal experiences and journey through life. I hope to touch everyone with this album and I pray the people find it worthwhile."

Reception
The album was met with great reception throughout Africa, but performed best in Ghana and Nigeria. The tracks "Gbono Feli Feli", "Igwe", and "Suddenly" influenced Africa's nightlife. The song "Fall in Love" was also met with commercial success, getting the most airplay from the album.

Singles
According to Bellanaija, "the music video for "Suddenly" was shot on location at Chief Razak Okoya's ‘Oluwa Ni Ishola’ Estate and directed by Sesan Ogunro. It features D’Banj, a bevy of scantily clad women, Ikechukwu, Wande Coal, Don Baba J and the rest of the Mo Hits Crew."
The music video for "Kimon" was directed by Sesan.
A video uploaded to YouTube shows the Kokomaster performing  "Igwe" with Wande Coal. D'banj also performed the song at the 2012 Hackney Weekend in London.
"Olorun Maje" is a single from his third studio album.
"Entertainer" is a single from this album.
"Gbono Feli Feli" was produced by Don Jazzy. The music video for the single was shot in London and directed by Sesan. The music video first aired on an episode of reality television show, Koko Mansion. Olamildent described the music video, saying: "In this new video, D'banj poses as the prince charming who rescues the damsel or should I say kokolette in distress." Upon its release, the song and its music video was met with positive reviews. Onos O of Bellanaija, reflecting on the songs that shaped the Nigerian music industry, said: "This song and its video are like plot points in Nigerian pop culture. D’Banj and Don Jazzy didn’t take it easy on the music industry when this song came out. Mo Gbono Feli Feli took Nigeria by storm; the special effects and locations in the video were like none anyone had ever seen in the industry before, back then." M.I did a cover of the song, which was included on his iLLegal Music mixtape.

Track listing

References

2008 albums
D'banj albums
Albums produced by Don Jazzy
Yoruba-language albums
2008 in Nigerian music